The David di Donatello for Best Editing is a film award presented annually by the Accademia del Cinema Italiano (ACI, Academy of Italian Cinema) to recognize outstanding efforts on the part of film editors who have worked within the Italian film industry during the year preceding the ceremony. It was first presented during the 1981 edition of the David di Donatello award show.

Winners and nominees
Winners are indicated in bold.

1980s
1981
 Ruggero Mastroianni – Camera d'albergo
 Nino Baragli - Bianco, rosso e Verdone
 Enzo Meniconi - La baraonda

1982
 Ruggero Mastroianni – Tales of Ordinary Madness
 Franco Letti - The Opportunities of Rosa
 Roberto Perpignani - Sweet Dreams

1983
 Roberto Perpignani – The Night of the Shooting Stars
 Raimondo Crociani - Il mondo nuovo
 Ruggero Mastroianni - All My Friends Part 2

1984
 Raimondo Crociani – Le Bal
 Franco Fraticelli - Where's Picone?
 Ruggero Mastroianni - And the Ship Sails On

1985
 Ruggero Mastroianni – Carmen
 Roberto Perpignani - Kaos
 Nino Baragli - Secrets Secrets

1986
 Ruggero Mastroianni – Let's Hope It's a Girl
 Nino Baragli, Ugo De Rossi, and Ruggero Mastroianni - Ginger and Fred
 Luigi Zita - Camorra

1987
 Francesco Malvestito – The Family
 Amedeo Salfa - Christmas Present
 Jane Seitz - The Name of the Rose

1988
 Gabriella Cristiani – The Last Emperor
 Nino Baragli - Intervista
 Enzo Meniconi - Dark Eyes

1989
 Ermanno Olmi – The Legend of the Holy Drinker
 Gabriella Cristiani - Francesco
 Nino Baragli - The Little Devil

1990s
1990
 Nino Baragli – The Voice of the Moon
 Simona Paggi - Open Doors
 Amedeo Salfa - The Story of Boys & Girls
 Nino Baragli  - On Tour
 Ruggero Mastroianni - The Palermo Connection

1991
 Nino Baragli – Mediterraneo
 Mirco Garrone - The Yes Man
 Angelo Nicolini - The Station
 Franco Fraticelli - Boys on the Outside
 Carla Simoncelli - Ultrà

1992
 Antonio Siciliano – Maledetto il giorno che t'ho incontrato (ex aequo)
 Simona Paggi – The Stolen Children (ex aequo)
 Claudio Di Mauro - The Rubber Wall

1993
 Carla Simoncelli – The Escort
 Nino Baragli - Jonah Who Lived in the Whale
 Jacopo Quadri - Death of a Neapolitan Mathematician

1994
 Carlo Valerio – Father and Son
 Nino Baragli – For Love, Only for Love
 Marco Garrone – Caro diario

1995
 Roberto Perpignani – Il Postino: The Postman
 Ruggero Mastroianni – Sostiene Pereira
 Simona Paggi – Lamerica
 Jacopo Quadri – Nasty Love

1996
 Cecilia Zanuso – Who Killed Pasolini?
 Ugo De Rossi – Palermo - Milan One Way
 Massimo Quaglia – The Star Maker
 Pietro Scalia – Stealing Beauty
 Carla Simoncelli – Strangled Lives

1997
 Ruggero Mastroianni and Bruno Sarandrea – The Truce
 Francesca Calvelli – The Prince of Homburg
 Massimo Fiocchi – Nirvana
 Mirco Garrone – The Cyclone
 Roberto Perpignani – Marianna Ucrìa

1998
 Jacopo Quadri – Rehearsals for War
 Simona Paggi – Life Is Beautiful
 Jacopo Quadri – Ovosodo

1999
 Esmeralda Calabria – Not of this World
 Massimo Paglia – The Legend of 1900
 Cecilia Zanuso – Marriages

2000s
2000
 Carla Simoncelli – Canone inverso
 Jacopo Quadri – Olympic Garage
 Cecilia Zanuso – Ormai è fatta

2001
 Claudio Di Mauro – The Last Kiss
 Esmeralda Calabria – The Son's Room
 Roberto Missiroli – One Hundred Steps

2002
 Paolo Cottignola – The Profession of Arms
 Carlotta Cristiani -Burning in the Wind
 Massimo Fiocchi – Amnèsia

2003
 Cecilia Zanuso – El Alamein: The Line of Fire
 Claudio Di Mauro – Remember Me, My Love
 Patrizio Marone – Facing Windows
 Amedeo Salfa – Incantato
 Marco Spoletini – The Embalmer

2004
 Roberto Missiroli – The Best of Youth
 Francesca Calvelli – Good Morning, Night
 Claudio Di Mauro – What Will Happen to Us
 Patrizio Marone – Don't Move
 Jacopo Quadri – The Dreamers

2005
 Claudio Cutry – A Children's Story
 Claudio Cormio – After Midnight
 Claudio Di Mauro – Manual of Love
 Giogiò Franchini – The Consequences of Love
 Patrizio Marone – Cuore Sacro
 Simona Paggi – The Keys to the House

2006
 Esmeralda Calabria – Romanzo Criminale
 Osvaldo Bargero – The Fever
 Claudio Di Mauro – My Best Enemy
 Luciana Pandolfelli – Notte prima degli esami
 Cecilia Zanuso – The Beast in the Heart

2007
 Mirco Garrone – My Brother Is an Only Child
 Francesca Calvelli – The Wedding Director
 Maryline Monthieux – Nuovomondo
 Massimo Quaglia – The Unknown Woman
 Patrizio Marone – Saturn in Opposition

2008
 Giogiò Franchini - The Girl by the Lake
 Paolo Cottignola - The Right Distance
 Carlotta Cristiani - Days and Clouds
 Eduardo Crespo and Giorgio Diritti - The Wind Blows Round
 Angelo Nicolini - Quiet Chaos

2009
 Marco Spoletini - Gomorrah
 Esmeralda Calabria - Giulia Doesn't Date at Night
 Luciana Pandolfelli - Many Kisses Later
 Cristiano Travaglioli - Il divo
 Cecilia Zanuso - Si può fare

2010s
2010
 Francesca Calvelli - Vincere
 Massimo Quaglia - Baarìa
 Giorgio Diritti and Paolo Marzoni - The Man Who Will Come
 Simone Manetti - The First Beautiful Thing
 Patrizio Marone - Loose Cannons

2011
 Alessio Doglione - 20 Cigarettes
 Mirco Garrone - La nostra vita
 Jacopo Quadri - Noi credevamo
 Francesca Calvelli - Sorelle Mai
 Consuelo Catucci - Angel of Evil

2012
 Roberto Perpignani - Caesar Must Die
 Patrizio Marone - ACAB – All Cops Are Bastards
 Esmeralda Calabria - We Have a Pope
 Francesca Calvelli - Piazza Fontana: The Italian Conspiracy
 Cristiano Travaglioli - This Must Be the Place

2013
 Benni Atria - Diaz – Don't Clean Up This Blood
 Clelio Benevento - Long Live Freedom
 Walter Fasano - A Five Star Life
 Massimo Quaglia - The Best Offer
 Marco Spoletini - Reality

2014
 Cecilia Zanuso - Human Capital
 Giogiò Franchini - Miele
 Patrizio Marone - Fasten Your Seatbelts
 Cristiano Travaglioli - The Great Beauty
 Gianni Vezzosi - I Can Quit Whenever I Want

2015
 Cristiano Travaglioli - Black Souls
 Francesca Calvelli - Hungry Hearts
 Jacopo Quadri - Leopardi
 Massimo Fiocchi and Chiara Griziotti - Italy in a Day
 Clelio Benevento - Mia Madre

2016
 Andrea Maguolo with the collaboration of Federico Conforti - They Call Me Jeeg
 Jacopo Quadri - Fire at Sea
 Consuelo Catucci - Perfect Strangers
 Patrizio Marone - Suburra
 Cristiano Travaglioli - Youth

2017
 Gianni Vezzosi - Italian Race
 Consuelo Catucci - 7 Minutes
 Chiara Griziotti - Indivisible
 Cecilia Zanuso - Like Crazy
 Alessio Doglione - La stoffa dei sogni

2018
 Affonso Gonçalves - A Ciambra
 Federico Maria Maneschi - Ammore e malavita
 Massimo Quaglia - The Girl in the Fog
 Stefano Cravero - Nico, 1988
 Consuelo Catucci - The Place

2019
 Marco Spoletini - Dogman
 Jacopo Quadri and Natalie Cristiani - Capri-Revolution
 Walter Fasano - Call Me by Your Name
 Giogiò Franchini - Euphoria
 Chiara Vullo - On My Skin

2020s
2020
 Francesca Calvelli - The Traitor
 Granni Vezzosi - The First King: Birth of an Empire
 Jacopo Quadri - The Mayor of Rione Sanità
 Aline Hervé and Fabrizio Federico - Martin Eden
 Marco Spoletini - Pinocchio

References

External links
 
 David di Donatello official website

David di Donatello
Film editing awards